Betsy Gay (born February 2, 1929) is an American former yodeler and actress. She was born in Waterford, Connecticut to Charles and Helen Gay, who were also entertainers. She appeared in films, television, and radio shows. Her film career mostly consisted of bit-part roles during the Golden Age of Hollywood, such as The Adventures of Tom Sawyer (1938), Our Gang Follies of 1938 and Mystery Plane (1939). Her final role was in 1943. Throughout her singing career, she worked alongside the likes of Dale Evans, Stuart Hamblen, and Tex Williams. She won a yodeling competition in California two years in a row in the mid-1940s. She had several music recordings with labels such as Capitol Records and Decca Records.

Personal life
Gay was married to Thomas Cashen between 1954 and 2005. The couple had five children in total.

Filmography

References

External links
 
 Discogs profile

1929 births
Living people
American film actresses
Yodelers
20th-century American actresses